Eden Island is one of the many uninhabited Canadian Arctic islands in the Qikiqtaaluk Region, Nunavut. It is a Baffin Island offshore island located in Frobisher Bay, southeast of Iqaluit. Other islands in the immediate vicinity include Daniel Island, Falk Island, Fletcher Island, Redan Island, and Scalene Island.

References 

 Eden Island at Atlas of Canada

Islands of Baffin Island
Uninhabited islands of Qikiqtaaluk Region
Islands of Frobisher Bay